I Hate Blondes (Italian: Odio le bionde) is a 1980 Italian crime comedy film directed by Giorgio Capitani.

Plot

Cast 

 Enrico Montesano as Emilio Serrantoni
 Jean Rochefort as  Donald
 Corinne Cléry as  Angelica 
 Marina Langner as  Valeria  
 Paola Tedesco as Teresa 
 Gigi Ballista as Psychoanalyst 
 Ivan Desny as  Brown
 Roberto Della Casa as  Serge 
 Anita Durante as Old woman in the church

See also    
 List of Italian films of 1980

References

External links

1980 films
Italian crime comedy films
1980s crime comedy films
Films directed by Giorgio Capitani
Films about writers
Blond hair
Films scored by Piero Umiliani
1980 comedy films
1980s Italian-language films
1980s Italian films